Arnabanda was a town of ancient Lycia.

Its site is located near Alacahisar, Anatolia, in modern Turkey.

References

Populated places in ancient Lycia
Former populated places in Turkey